FV Nyggjaberg was a Faeroese Trawler that was torpedoed by the  in the Atlantic Ocean southeast of Iceland on 7 March 1942 while she was travelling from the Faroe Islands to the Icelandic Fishing grounds.

Construction 
Nyggjaberg was launched in June 1916 at the Cook, Welton & Gemmell Ltd. shipyard in Hull, United Kingdom and completed in September of the same year. The ship could generate 82 n.h.p. with a speed of 10.5 knots.

Sinking 
Nyggjaberg left the Faroe Islands for the Icelandic Fishing grounds on 15 February 1942. On 7 March 1942 at 23.14 pm when she was hit on starboard side by a G7e torpedo from the German submarine U-701 southeast of Iceland. She sank within two minutes with no survivors from her 21-man crew.

Wreck 

References

1916 ships
Trawlers
World War II shipwrecks in the Atlantic Ocean
Ships sunk by German submarines in World War II
Ships lost with all hands
Maritime incidents in March 1942
Steamships of the Faroe Islands
Ships built in the United Kingdom